The Cervantes Islands are a small group of islands in Western Australia, found to the south west of Cervantes.

Island group
The Cervantes Islands are a group of three individual islands:

The islands are named for an American whaling ship that was wrecked off the North island in 1844. The ship was named after the writer Miguel de Cervantes.

The Australian sea lion is known to inhabit the islands.

See also
 List of islands of Western Australia

References

Turquoise Coast (Western Australia)
Nature reserves in Western Australia